Neeya may refer to:
 Neeya?, a 1979 film
 Neeya, a TV series
  character from Infinite Ryvius anime series